Alain Cortes (born 7 July 1952) is a French modern pentathlete. He competed at the 1976 and 1980 Summer Olympics.

References

External links
 

1952 births
Living people
French male modern pentathletes
Olympic modern pentathletes of France
Modern pentathletes at the 1976 Summer Olympics
Modern pentathletes at the 1980 Summer Olympics
20th-century French people